L&L Energy, Inc. was an American company headquartered in Seattle, Washington, in the business of producing, processing, and selling coal in the People's Republic of China.

As of 2011, the company was focused on acquiring small-scale coal mining operations in China, as well as supplies of American coal that it planned to process and sell in China.

The company was de-listed from the NASDAQ in April 2014, shortly following the announcement of investigations of the company by the SEC and Department of Justice. In 2015, the U.S. District Court sentenced the company to five years of probation, and CEO Dickson Lee to a five-year prison term for securities fraud. Lee was accused of misrepresenting the company's chief financial officer and internal controls in order to achieve a stock market listing, and of deceiving investors.

Former U.S. Transportation Secretary Norman Mineta at one time served on the board of the company.

References

External links
FBI request

Coal companies of the United States
Holding companies of the United States
Energy companies established in 1995
Non-renewable resource companies established in 1995
Companies based in Seattle
Companies traded over-the-counter in the United States

Energy companies disestablished in 2015
Non-renewable resource companies disestablished in 2015